César Arturo Ramos Palazuelos (born 5 December 1983) is a Mexican professional football referee. He has been a full international for FIFA since 2014. He refereed matches in CONCACAF Champions League, in the 2018 FIFA World Cup in the 2019 AFC Asian Cup, and in the 2022 FIFA World Cup.

Refereeing career
Ramos made his debut on 28 October 2006, in a Primera División A match between Zacatepec and Santos Laguna 1a. 'A'. Ramos made his First Division debut as a fourth official on 15 January 2011, in a match between San Luis and Puebla in San Luis Potosí. Later that year, Ramos made his First Division debut as a central referee in a match between Monterrey and Tijuana in Monterrey.

The first player Ramos booked in the First Division was Fernando Arce while the first player he sent off was Mariano Trujillo after he booked him twice in 15 minutes.

Ramos refereed the 2017 FIFA Club World Cup Final between Real Madrid and Gremio.

Ramos was the only Mexican center referee assigned to referee at the 2018 FIFA World Cup.

In 2019, Ramos participated in a referee exchange program between the AFC and CONCACAF, where Ramos would referee in the 2019 AFC Asian Cup and Abdulrahman Al-Jassim of Qatar would referee at the 2019 CONCACAF Gold Cup.

Ramos refereed the 2022 FIFA World Cup semi-final match between France and Morocco on 14 December.

Record

FIFA World Cup

AFC Asian Cup

References

External links

1983 births
Living people
Sportspeople from Culiacán
Mexican football referees
CONCACAF Champions League referees
CONCACAF Gold Cup referees
2018 FIFA World Cup referees
2022 FIFA World Cup referees
FIFA World Cup referees
Football referees at the 2016 Summer Olympics
AFC Asian Cup referees